Marquess Nangnang, personal name Wang Gyeong was a Korean Royal Prince as the second son of Jeongjong of Goryeo and Queen Yongui. In 1052 after succeeded the Gaebudongsamsa Sutaebo Gyeomsangseoryeong (개부의동삼사 수태보 겸상서령), he became Marquess Nangnang of the Sangju State (상주국낙랑후) and received 3.000 Sik-eup (식읍), also held the position of Suseonghyeobribongdeokgongsin (수성협리봉덕공신) too.

References

External links
Marquess Nangnang on Encykorea .

Korean princes
Year of birth unknown
Year of death unknown
Date of birth unknown
Date of death unknown